Policy Matters Ohio is a nonprofit, progressive think tank based in Ohio. The organization has proposed funding health and human service investments by increasing state income taxes on Ohio's upper tax brackets. It has documented the cost to communities of tax incentives given to businesses.

References

External links
 

Organizations based in Cleveland
Organizations established in 2000
Think tanks based in the United States